Ozolnieki is a village in Ozolnieki Parish, Jelgava Municipality in the Semigallia region of Latvia.

References

Towns and villages in Latvia
Jelgava Municipality
Doblen County
Semigallia